Sandro César Cordovil de Lima (born 28 October 1990) is Brazilian football player who plays as a forward for Gwangju FC of South Korean K League 2.

Club career
He made his professional debut in the Primeira Liga for Rio Ave on 1 September 2013 in a game against Arouca.

On 19 June 2022, he joined Gwangju FC.

References

External links

1990 births
Sportspeople from Belém
Living people
Brazilian footballers
Brazilian expatriate footballers
Rio Ave F.C. players
Académico de Viseu F.C. players
G.D. Estoril Praia players
Gil Vicente F.C. players
Tianjin Jinmen Tiger F.C. players
Gençlerbirliği S.K. footballers
Gwangju FC players
Chinese Super League players
Liga Portugal 2 players
Primeira Liga players
Süper Lig players
TFF First League players
K League 2 players
Association football forwards
Expatriate footballers in Portugal
Brazilian expatriate sportspeople in Portugal
Expatriate footballers in China
Brazilian expatriate sportspeople in China
Expatriate footballers in Turkey
Brazilian expatriate sportspeople in Turkey